Kurishuyudham is a 1984 Indian Malayalam-language horror film directed by Baby and written by Pappanamkodu Lakshmanan from a story by Pushparajan. The film stars Prem Nazir, Madhu, Srividya and Mohanlal in the lead roles. The film has musical score by K. J. Joy.

Plot

Horror Movie

Cast
Prem Nazir as James
Madhu as Matthew Cheriyachan
Srividya as Rosamma
Mohanlal as Jerry
Madhavi as Susie, Daisy (double role)
T. G. Ravi as Issac John
C. I. Paul as Paili
Jose Prakash as Father Bernard
Kollam G. K. Pilla as Paappi
Prathapachandran as Doctor Charles
Jagannatha Varma as D.I.G. Sajan Varghese
Captain Raju as Magician d'Souza/Lawrence
Anuradha as dancer
Santhakumari as Annamma
Santhosh as Simon

Soundtrack
The music was composed by K. J. Joy and the lyrics were written by Poovachal Khader.

Release

References

External links
 

1984 films
Indian police films
Indian horror films
Fictional portrayals of the Kerala Police
1980s Malayalam-language films
Films directed by Baby (director)